Caroline Hatlapa (born 2 May 1958) is an Austrian equestrian. She competed in the individual dressage event at the 1996 Summer Olympics.

References

External links
 

1958 births
Living people
Austrian female equestrians
Austrian dressage riders
Olympic equestrians of Austria
Equestrians at the 1996 Summer Olympics
People from Rhein-Kreis Neuss
Sportspeople from Düsseldorf (region)